The Big 12 Conference Pitcher of the Year is a baseball award given to the Big 12 Conference's most outstanding pitcher. The award was first given following the 2001 season. It is selected by the league's head coaches, who are not allowed to vote for their own players.

Key

Winners

Winners by school

Footnotes
  Nebraska left in 2011 to join the Big Ten.
  Iowa State discontinued its baseball program after the 2001 season.
  Missouri and Texas A&M left in 2012 to join the SEC.

References

Awards established in 2001
Player
NCAA Division I baseball conference players of the year